Joanstown is a townland in County Westmeath, Ireland.

Joanstown is one of 26 townlands of the civil parish of Rathaspick in the barony of Moygoish in the Province of Leinster. The neighbouring townlands are: Corrydonnellan to the north, Cappagh to the north–east, Ballinalack to the east, Cullenhugh to the south–east, Baronstown Demesne and Corry to the south, Kilmacahill or Caraun and Rathowen (Edward) to the west and Rathowen and Russagh to the north–west.

In the 1911 census of Ireland, there were 16 houses and 58 inhabitants in the townland.

References

External links
Map of Joanstown at openstreetmap.org
Joanstown at The IreAtlas Townland Data Base
Joanstown at Townlands.ie
Joanstown at Logainm.ie

Townlands of County Westmeath